Loud Pipes Save Lives is the fifth studio album by Swedish singer-songwriter E-Type, which was released in 2004. It is the last E-Type album to feature vocalist Nana Hedin. E-Type participated with "Paradise" in Melodifestivalen 2004, ending up at 5th place. "Paradise" was the first single released to European audiences and became a hit.

The album features a guest appearance by death metal vocalist LG Petrov.

Track listing

Sport Edition (Sweden only)
"Loud Pipes Save Lives"
"Olympia"
"Campione 2000"
"Paradise (feat. Na Na)"   
"The Predator"
"Dans La Fantasie"
"The Original You"
"Far Up in the Air (feat. Na Na)"
"Forever More (feat. Na Na & LG)"
"Rain"
"If Heaven Were to Fall"
"Lost and Goodbye"

Chart positions

References

2004 albums
E-Type (musician) albums
Albums produced by Max Martin